Joshua S. Gottheimer (born March 8, 1975) is an American attorney, writer, and public policy adviser who has served as the U.S. representative for  since 2017. The district stretches along the northern border of the state from New York City's densely populated metropolitan suburbs in Bergen County northwest through exurban and rural territory in northern Passaic and Sussex Counties.

A member of the Democratic Party, Gottheimer was a speechwriter for Bill Clinton and served as an adviser to the presidential campaigns of Wesley Clark, John Kerry, and Hillary Clinton. He has also worked for Burson Cohn & Wolfe, the Federal Communications Commission, Ford Motor Company, and Microsoft.

Early life and education

Gottheimer was born in Livingston, New Jersey, on March 8, 1975. At the age of 16, Gottheimer served as a U.S. Senate page for Frank Lautenberg, a senator from New Jersey. Through high school and college, Gottheimer held internships with C-SPAN, the U.S. Senate secretary, and Tom Foley, the speaker of the U.S. House of Representatives.

Gottheimer graduated from West Essex High School, the University of Pennsylvania, and Harvard Law School. He was a member of the Alpha Epsilon Pi fraternity. While in college, he served on the "rapid response team" for Bill Clinton's 1996 reelection campaign. After Clinton's reelection, Gottheimer attended Pembroke College, Oxford on a Thouron Award, studying toward a DPhil in modern history.

Early career 
Gottheimer joined the Clinton administration as a speechwriter in 1998, at age 23, working in the administration until its end in 2001. While attending law school, he worked as an adviser for Wesley Clark's 2004 presidential campaign, John Kerry's 2004 presidential campaign, and Hillary Clinton's 2008 presidential campaign. After the 2004 election, Gottheimer worked for the Ford Motor Company, then became an executive vice president at Burson Cohn & Wolfe. From 2010 to 2012, he worked for the Federal Communications Commission, where he led an initiative related to broadband internet. He subsequently became a strategist at Microsoft.

U.S. House of Representatives

Elections

2016 

Cory Booker joined him when he officially announced his candidacy.

Gottheimer attracted more attention than previous challengers to Garrett due to his fundraising ability and ties to the Clintons. The New York Times ran a prominent article about his Clinton ties, describing him as a protégé of the Clintons and noting that Bill and Chelsea Clinton had appeared at a recent Manhattan fundraiser for Gottheimer at which Chelsea introduced him as "something of a family member." His campaign's 2015 financial filings, in which Gottheimer reported raising around $1 million through the end of September, showed that "about one dollar in six came directly from fellow alumni of the Clinton White House and campaigns...or from major donors and employees of consulting firms tied closely to the Clintons." Among those who donated were three former Clinton press secretaries and two former Clinton chiefs of staff.

The 5th had historically been one of the more Republican districts in New Jersey, but redistricting after the 2010 census had made it slightly more Democratic by pushing it further into Bergen County. During the campaign, Garrett criticized Gottheimer "for taking a donation from Ibrahim Al-Rashid, the son of a Saudi multimillionaire who pleaded guilty in 2014 to simple assault of his estranged wife." Gottheimer and national Democrats attacked Garrett for his social conservatism, particularly comments he made about openly gay Republican candidates, arguing that these views showed Garrett was too conservative for the district.

Gottheimer defeated Garrett, primarily on the strength of a strong showing in the district's share of Bergen County, home to over three-fourths of the district's voters. He won Bergen by over 33,800 votes, more than double his overall margin of almost 14,900 votes. It was the most expensive House race in New Jersey history. He was sworn in on January 3, 2017– the first Democrat to represent this district since 1981, when it was numbered the 7th District (it has been the 5th since 1983).

2018 

Gottheimer was reelected in 2018, defeating Republican nominee John McCann with 56% of the vote. While he lost three of the district's four counties,  Gottheimer won a second term on the strength of carrying the district's share of Bergen County by over 51,000 votes, more than his overall margin of 41,300 votes.

2020 

Gottheimer won a third term in 2020, defeating Republican nominee Frank Pallotta with 53% of the vote. As in his previous campaigns, he lost three of the district's four counties, but swamped Pallotta in the district's share of Bergen County, this time by 52,600 votes, more than his overall margin of 32,800 votes. He was also helped by Joe Biden carrying the district with 52% of the vote.

2022 

Gottheimer defeated Republican nominee Frank Pallotta with 54.7% of the vote.

In May 2022, Gottheimer became involved in the Republican primary contest that would decide his eventual general election opponent. He sent mail to Republican voters that compared Pallotta, a repeat candidate whom Gottheimer had already beaten in the previous House election, to former Republican president Donald Trump.

Pallotta won the primary, defeating front-runner and US Marine Corps combat veteran Nick De Gregorio by 1,475 votes, setting up a general election that Gottheimer was heavily favored to win.

Tenure
In the first session of the 115th United States Congress, Gottheimer was ranked the eighth most bipartisan member of the House by the Bipartisan Index, a metric published by The Lugar Center and Georgetown's McCourt School of Public Policy. In January 2018, Gottheimer was one of six House Democrats who voted with Republicans for a short-term spending bill in an attempt to stave off a federal government shutdown.

He is the Democratic co-chair of the bipartisan Problem Solvers Caucus.

Gottheimer voted to impeach Trump a second time following the January 6, 2021, storming of the U.S. Capitol.

Gottheimer emerged as a leader of the "Unbreakable Nine", who in August 2021 pushed to decouple the bipartisan infrastructure bill from the Build Back Better Act. The two bills were voted on separately, and only the bipartisan infrastructure bill became law (because conservative senators refused to support BBB).

Committee assignments

Committee on Financial Services
Subcommittee on Diversity and Inclusion
Subcommittee on Investor Protection, Entrepreneurship and Capital Markets
Subcommittee on National Security, International Development, and Monetary Policy

Caucus memberships
Blue Dog Coalition 
New Democrat Coalition 
Climate Solutions Caucus
Problem Solvers Caucus

Political positions
Some consider Gottheimer a conservative Democrat, with GovTrack rating him the most conservative Democrat in the House as of February 2021, as well as more conservative than 32 House Republicans. During Donald Trump's presidency, Gottheimer voted in line with Trump more often than any other Democrat in Congress. As of November 2021, he had voted in line with Joe Biden's stated position 100% of the time.

Gottheimer has pointed to his work with the Problem Solvers Caucus as proof that he is not "ideologically rigid". He has also said that members of Congress "are more bipartisan than people think".

Taxes
On April 15, 2017, Gottheimer announced that he would be introducing the "Anti-Moocher Bill", under which states receiving more federal dollars than they contribute to the national treasury would pay their "fair share", asking: "Why should Alabama get our federal tax dollars and get a free ride, while we're left holding the bag with higher property taxes? It just doesn't make sense."

Gottheimer is a proponent of restoring the full State And Local Tax (SALT) deduction.

Health care
In 2017, Gottheimer said "we need to fix the Affordable Care Act. There's plenty wrong with it, whether it's the medical device tax or the Cadillac tax." He also felt that the American Health Care Act of 2017 did not reflect an effort "to reach across the aisle".

Infrastructure

Gottheimer supports New Jersey infrastructure projects, including the Lackawanna Cut-Off and the Gateway Tunnel.

In August 2021, Gottheimer led a group of centrist Democrats who threatened to derail the Biden administration's $3.5 trillion budget reconciliation package meant to tackle infrastructure.

Syria
Gottheimer said that he thought President Donald Trump acted appropriately in striking Syria in response to the 2018 use of chemical weapons by the Syrian government. "There's room the president has to deal with a crisis, and I believed, if you looked at the heinous crimes and atrocities committed, poisoning your own children, that demanded a response, and I'm glad he responded."

Donald Trump
In 2017, Gottheimer called for an independent commission to probe alleged ties between Donald Trump and Russia.

Of the possibility of impeaching Trump over the Ukraine scandal, in September 2019 Gottheimer said, "We need to make sure this is fact-driven and evidence-based. You can't prejudge something that is so solemn and obviously could have a big historical impact on our country, and you need to keep the country together." Gottheimer voted to impeach Trump during both his first impeachment and his second impeachment.

Gottheimer was one of eight Democrats to vote against a resolution that would curtail Trump's war powers following the assassination of Iranian general Qasem Soleimani in January 2020.

Drugs 
In 2019, Gottheimer stated his opposition to the legalization of recreational marijuana. The statement came after he voted for a bill that would end the federal penalization of banks that serve the cannabis industry.

Congressional stock trading 
Gottheimer supports Representative Abigail Spanberger's Transparent Representation Upholding Service and Trust (TRUST) in Congress Act, which has 50 co-sponsors.

Ukraine 
Gottheimer and Representative Brian Fitzpatrick introduced House legislation to support Senator Joe Manchin's initiative to close American ports to Russian oil, natural gas, and coal products.

Electoral history

Books
He is the editor of Ripples of Hope (2003), a collection of American civil-rights speeches. The text of one of the speeches included in the book, which was delivered by Martin Luther King Jr. in Selma on January 25, 1965, was previously unpublished. Gottheimer acquired the text from an Alabama police consultant who had transcribed it from FBI surveillance tapes.

He is also co-author, with Mary Frances Berry, of Power of Words (2011), a book about Barack Obama's speeches.

Personal life
Gottheimer is a native of North Caldwell, and he currently resides in Wyckoff. He is Jewish and a member of the Alpha Epsilon Pi fraternity. He married Marla Tusk in 2006. Together, they have two children.

Bibliography

See also

 List of Jewish members of the United States Congress

References

External links

 Congressman Josh Gottheimer official U.S. House website
 U.S. Congress campaign website
 

 

|-

|-

1975 births
21st-century American Jews
21st-century American politicians
American male non-fiction writers
American speechwriters
Clinton administration personnel
Federal Communications Commission personnel
Harvard Law School alumni
Democratic Party members of the United States House of Representatives from New Jersey
Jewish American attorneys
Jewish members of the United States House of Representatives
Living people
Microsoft people
People from North Caldwell, New Jersey
People from Wyckoff, New Jersey
University of Pennsylvania alumni
West Essex High School alumni
American Jews from New Jersey